Territorialism can refer to:
Animal territorialism, the animal behavior of defending a geographical area from intruders
Environmental territorialism, a stance toward threats posed toward individuals, communities or nations by environmental events and trends 
Jewish Territorialist Organization, a Jewish political movement in the early 20th century advocating settlement in a number of territories outside of the Holy Land as an alternative to Zionism
Territorialist School, a contemporary Italian approach to urban and regional planning
Land tenure, the legal regime in which land is owned by an individual
Feudalism, a legal and military system of hierarchical land holding
Statism, the belief that the state should control economic or social policy, or both, to some degree
Statism in Shōwa Japan

See also
Territory (disambiguation)